Man of Gold is a 1919Hungarian silent drama film directed by Alexander Korda and starring Oszkár Beregi, Gábor Rajnay and Margit Makay. The movie is based on the novel The Man with the Golden Touch by Mór Jókai.

Cast
 Oszkár Beregi - Tímár Mihály (as Beregi Oszkár)
 Gábor Rajnay - Todor Krisztyán
 Margit Makay - Kondja
 Ica von Lenkeffy - Noémi (as R.Lenkeffy Ica)
 Lili Berky - Athalia
 Gyula Bartos - Maxim Krisztyán, tatăl lui Todor
 Jenő Horváth - Brazovic Atanáz
 Mari K. Demjén - Brazovic felesége
 Szeréna Fáy - Teréza mama
 Gyula Szőreghy - Pasha Ali Csorbadzsi
 Gusztáv Vándory - Kadisa kapitány (as Gyula Vándory)

References

Bibliography
 Charles Drazin: Korda: Britain’s Movie Mogul. Verlag I.B. Tauris, 2011, .
 Alan Goble: The Complete Index to Literary Sources in Film. Verlag Walter de Gruyter, 1999, S. 247, 525, 856.
 Maurus Jokai: Ein Goldmensch! Roman, aus dem Ungarischen. Druck u. Verlag v. Otto Janke, Berlin 1873.
 Karol Kulik: Alexander Korda: the man who could work miracles. Verlag W. H. Allen, 1975.
 Claudio Magris: Donau. (Teil 2, Österreich/Slowakei/Ungarn)., 28. August 2009. (online bei wordpress.com)
 Stephen Sisa: The Spirit of Hungary: A Panorama of Hungarian History and Culture. Verlag Rákóczi Foundation, 1983, .
 Thomas Schmidinger: Ada Kaleh. Die vergessene „Insel des Islam“. In: Wiener Zeitung. 11./12. Mai 2013. (online at austria-forum.org)
 Paul Tabori: Alexander Korda. Verlag Living Books, 1966, S. 312.

External links

 Az aranyember, hangosfilm.hu

1919 films
Hungarian silent feature films
Hungarian drama films
1910s Hungarian-language films
Films directed by Alexander Korda
Films of the Hungarian Soviet Republic
Hungarian black-and-white films
1919 drama films
Silent drama films
Soviet silent films
Soviet black-and-white films